The Edmonton municipal election, 1989 was held on October 16 that year to elect a mayor and twelve aldermen to sit on Edmonton City Council, nine trustees to sit on the public school board, and seven trustees to sit on the separate school board. Edmontonians also voted in the Senate nominee election in conjunction with the municipal election.

This was the first election in which school trustees were elected by ward.

Voter turnout

There were 148068 ballots cast out of 406995 eligible voters, for a voter turnout of 36.4%.

Results

(bold indicates elected, italics indicate incumbent)

Mayor

(Laurence Decore was elected mayor in the 1986 election, but resigned to lead the Liberal Party of Alberta.  Cavanagh was selected by council to serve as his replacement.)

Aldermen

Ward 1

Public school trustees

One trustee is elected from each ward.  Additional trustees are elected by taking the non-victorious candidate with the most votes between each of Wards 1 and 4, Wards 2 and 3, and Ward 5 and 6.

Separate (Catholic) school trustees

One trustee is elected from each ward, and the non-victorious candidate with the most total votes is also elected.

Senate Nominee Election

This was a province-wide election.  Results below reflect only Edmonton vote totals; provincially, Stan Waters was elected (see 1989 Alberta Senate nominee election for province-wide results).

References

City of Edmonton: Edmonton Elections

1989
1989 elections in Canada
1989 in Alberta